The women's 1500 metres at the 2014 European Athletics Championships took place at the Letzigrund from August 12 to 15, 2014.

Medalists

Records

Schedule

Results

Round 1

First 4 in each heat (Q) and 4 best performers (q) advance to the Semifinals.

Final

References

Qualifying Round Results
Final Results

1500 W
1500 metres at the European Athletics Championships
2014 in women's athletics